John Boyd Thacher State Park is a state park located 15 miles (24 km) southwest of Albany, New York, near Voorheesville, in Albany County on State Route 157. Located mostly atop the Helderberg Escarpment, the park has several hiking trails that offer panoramic views of the Green Mountains in Vermont and the Taconic Mountains of the Hudson Valley.

Description

The Indian Ladder Trail is open from early summer to mid- November, 8:00 am until sunset, weather permitting. All other trails are open year-round. It is located on the Helderberg Escarpment, one of the best fossil-bearing formations in the US. There are over 12 miles (20 km) of trails in the park including the famous Indian Ladder Trail. Volleyball courts, children’s play areas and numerous cooking/barbecue areas both open and covered.

Nearby at Thompson's Lake, is the Emma Treadwell Thacher Nature Center, which opened in July 2001 and has permanent and occasional displays for the public to view. The center also offers educational programs and visitor information.

From the top of the escarpment, which reaches 1300 ft (400 m), there are fine views of the Hudson and Mohawk Valleys as well as spectacular panoramas of the Adirondacks and Green Mountains of Vermont.

History
The history of the park area dates back around 400 years to a time when the trail now known as the Indian Ladder Trail was used by the Mohawk Iroquois Indians to reach the trading post run by the Dutch.

It was here that in 1777, at a spot known as Tory Cave, Jacob Salsbury found refuge from settlers during the Burgoyne Invasion.

The region is very well drained as all surface water runs into the limestone, making it an infertile area for farming. There are some fertile areas along the streams and Dutch settlers were brought in to the region by Patroons to whom they paid heavy rents until they freed themselves of the burden through the so-called Helderberg War (also called the Anti-Rent War) of 1839.

The park is named after Albany mayor John Boyd Thacher whose widow, Emma Treadwell Thacher, donated the land in 1914. Since its opening the area was designated as a State Park. The park soon became popular with the residents of Upstate New York and many amenities were added.

It is most likely that the most prominent feature of the park, the Helderberg Escarpment got its name from the Dutch Helder meaning bright or light and Berg meaning mountain.

Park Faces Closure
In early 2010 the Governor of New York, David Paterson, announced that due to the state's massive budget deficit certain areas of the budget would have to be trimmed in order for the state to maintain proper functions. In his budget cuts, Paterson listed the Department of Parks and Recreation as one of the areas that would have funding slashed, which meant that certain parks would either be completely shut down or operated at a minimum capacity.

Upon learning Paterson's intentions, the people and local governments of New York began a collaborative effort to advocate for the budget to be amended to keep John Boyd Thacher State Park, as well as many other parks and historical sites open for the enjoyment of the people. They have used Facebook, Twitter, a website and petitions as tools to help them show their discontent and become more organized in their efforts to stop the park's closure.

Pressure from the public and from some members of the State Legislature resulted in a reversal of the closure proposal. State Senate leaders held a press conference on March 24, 2010 at the capitol, where they said $11.5 million would be restored to the budget to keep parks open.

Trails
There are over 12 miles (20 km) of trails in the park, the most famous trail being the Indian Ladder Trail.

Indian Ladder Trail
From the Indian Ladder parking lot, the visitor descends 60 ft (18 m) to the base of the escarpment via a metal staircase. From here the trail follows the base of the escarpment passing under the Minelot Falls and by the stream exiting from a small cave in the base of the rocks. This water is actually from Thompson Lake, some two miles (3 km) away, which makes its way through the porous limestone until it exits here. At the end of the trail, a second set of metal staircases take the visitor back to the top of the escarpment.  The trail then continues back to the parking lot, offering excellent panoramas.

Paint Mine Trail
On the opposite side of the road to the Indian Ladder Trail, this trail is available all year except in the spring. Snow conditions may make hiking difficult.  The trail is circular, about 6 miles (10 km) long through wooded areas.

The Long Path
The Long Path proposed by Vincent Schaefer of Schenectady is a long-distance hiking trail begun in the 1960s. The trail runs from the George Washington Bridge in New York City and ends at Thacher Park, a distance of 347.35 miles (559.01 km)

Natural history
The park is designated as a wildlife preserve. There are strict regulations on the non-removal of fossils, rocks, plants, animals and birds from the park. There are also rules on the use of snowmobiles during winter and damage to the park. Breach of the regulations can lead to prosecution.

Birds

In April 2004, the then New York State Governor George Pataki, announced that  of Thacher Park and nearby Thompson Lake were to be turned into a bird conservation area. This conservation area was modelled on the National Audubon Society's Important Bird Areas Program which was signed into law in 1997.

There are some 171 species of bird to be seen in the park, many of which are in the "of concern" status.  These include:
 Sharp-shinned hawk (Accipiter striatus)
 Northern goshawk (Accipiter gentilis)
 Eagle
 Golden-winged warbler (Vermivora chrysoptera)
 Cooper's hawk (Accipiter cooperii)
 Hermit thrush (Catharus guttatus)
 Winter wren (Troglodytes hiemalis)
 Black-throated blue warbler (Dendroica caerulescens)
 Black-throated green warbler (Dendroica virens)
 Louisiana (Seiurus motacilla) and northern (Seiurus noveboracensis) waterthrushes
 Canada warbler (Wilsonia canadensis)
 Worm-eating warbler (Helmitheros vermivorus)
 Common raven (Corvus corax)
 Red winged blackbird (Agelaius phoeniceus)

Plants
There is also a prolific variety of flowers, plants and trees within the park. As the park is a preserve, all species are protected within the park boundaries.
Eastern hemlock (Tsuga canadensis)
Eastern white pine (Pinus strobus)
Maple
Basswood (Tilia americana)
Canadian yew (Taxus canadensis)
Eastern redcedar (Juniperus virginiana)

There are several habitat types preserved in the park, including 3,700 m of calcareous cliff, bur black oak swamp, red maple swamp and emergent marsh/scrub swamp.

Among flowers that can be seen are

Flowering dogwood (Cornus florida)
Rock elm (Ulmus thomasii)
Snowberry(Symphoricarpos albus)
Hairy honeysuckle (Lonicera hirsuta)
Purple virgin's-bower (Clematis occidentalis)

Ferns and their relations are also found in cool damp areas especially along Indian Ladder Trail.

Walking fern (Asplenium rhizophyllum)
Purple-stemmed cliff brake (Pellaea atropurpurea)
Slender rock brake (Cryptogramma stelleri)
Maidenhair spleenwort (Asplenium trichomanes)
Wall-rue spleenwort (Asplenium ruta-muraria)

Geology
The Helderberg Plateau comprises a series of limestones of early Devonian age and is one of the most fossiliferous regions in the United States.  The park is a window in to New York's geological history, as the rocks here take us back in time hundreds of millions of years. In the 1800s, some of the world's most renowned pioneering geologists, such as Charles Lyell and Amos Eaton, visited this location due to its robust fossil assemblage. During this time James Hall, New York's first state paleontologist, frequently visited the Heldeberg Escarpment, making observations and documenting the unique fossil assemblage.  In the 1930s, Winifred Goldring, New York's state paleontologist and the first female state paleontologist in the nation, continued the work of pioneering geologists and in 1933 wrote a guide to Thacher State Park that is still in use to this day.

The escarpment features rocks of the Upper Silurian and Upper and Middle Ordovician ages resting below the Devonian rocks. At the base of the escarpment, the Schenectady beds are visible. The Rondout "waterlime" or dolomite overlies the Schenectady beds and is most pronounced below Minelot Falls. The escarpment consists primarily of the Manlius Formation at the base, which is overlain by the Coeymans Formation. The Manlius Formation contains stromatoporoids and abundant desiccation features, notably prism cracks. The Coeymans Formation is a more massive limestone, appears bluish in color, and contains corals and brachiopods, notably gypidula coeymansensis. The gradational contact between the Manlius and Coeymans Formations represents a transgression, or rise in sea level.  Overlying the Coeymans Formation, at the top of the escarpment, the Kalkberg Formation contains brachiopods and crinoids and is interpreted as even deeper marine deposits.  The New Scotland Formation contains interbedded shale and sandstone; an exposure is found in Minelot Creek, up creek of the Paint Mine parking area.  The Becraft Formation overlies the New Scotland Formation and is a coarse-grained limestone with abundant crinoid debris; it is best exposed in the northern section of the park near Carrick Road, where an unconformity separates the Becraft and overlying Oriskany Sandstone. Due to its predominant limestone bedrock, the park features karst topography which includes numerous disappearing streams, caves, sinkholes, and grikes. The park contains about 40 caves. The longest documented cave is Hailes Cave. This cave has 3,700 feet of mapped passages with about 2 miles of potentially unmapped passages.  The park also contains glacial features, common to this region, in the form of striated bedrock and glacial erratics.

See also
 List of New York state parks

References

General references

External links

The Long Path
 Pictures of the park
 New York State Parks: John Boyd Thacher State Park
 NY-NJTC: John Boyd Thacher State Park Details and Trail Info
 High Point Trail Info

State parks of New York (state)
Parks in Albany County, New York